The St. Francis Chapel in New Roads, Louisiana, also known as Saint Francis of Pointe Coupee, is a Gothic building built in 1894–95. It was listed on the National Register of Historic Places in 1979. It is the third church with this name built in Pointe Coupee. The first was built in 1738 and was the first permanent church in the region. The second church was built next to the Fort of Pointe Coupee and was dedicated on the Feast of St. Francis in 1760. Because of erosion of the river bank, it was dismantled in 1891, and its location and graveyard were lost to the river. The third church was built at a different location, incorporating many of the furnishings and fixtures of the second church. Construction began in the autumn of 1894, and the church was dedicated in May 1895.

References

Churches on the National Register of Historic Places in Louisiana
Carpenter Gothic church buildings in Louisiana
Churches completed in 1895
19th-century churches in the United States
Churches in Pointe Coupee Parish, Louisiana
National Register of Historic Places in Pointe Coupee Parish, Louisiana